Ishk may refer to:

 Institute for the Study of Human Knowledge, the educational charity founded by the psychologist Robert E. Ornstein in Los Altos, California, US.
 Ishkashimi language, the language spoken in Afghanistan and Tajikistan.
 Ichthyological Society of Hong Kong, an organization for the professional analysis about ichthyological-based biodiversity and the fish-related knowledge education in Hong Kong.
 Island School Hong Kong, a secondary school